Michael "Buddy" Kofoid (born December 2, 2001) is an American professional dirt track and stock car racing driver.  He competes full-time in the USAC National Midget Series and POWRi Lucas Oil National Midget Series, driving for Keith Kunz Motorsports. He is the 2021 and 2022 USAC National Midget Series champion. He also competed part-time in the NASCAR Camping World Truck Series, driving the No. 51 Toyota Tundra for Kyle Busch Motorsports, and part-time in the ARCA Menards Series, driving the No. 15 Toyota Camry for Venturini Motorsports. He also has competed with the NOS Energy Drink World of Outlaws Sprint car Series. He collected his first Win at Husets Speedway on June 23rd 2022.

Early career 
Kofoid began racing at the age of 5, driving outlaw cars. He began driving sprint cars after receiving his first one when he was 10. He was the youngest driver to win a sprint car A-Main in the New Zealand National Sprint Car Series in 2013, at 11-years old. He competed full-time in the Western Sprint Tour when he was 13, finishing 2nd in the final standings. He won a sprint car race at Placerville Speedway in 2016, which made him the youngest person in history to win at the track. Throughout most of his career, Kofoid primarily competes in sprint car and midget car racing events, and occasionally late model races.

United States Auto Club 
Kofoid attempted to make his USAC National Midget Series debut in 2018, but would fail to qualify. In 2019, he joined Keith Kunz Motorsports for a part-time effort. He would win in his first career national midget car debut, at Jacksonville Speedway. On December 14, 2019, Kofoid would sign a full time effort in the USAC National Midget Series with Keith Kunz Motorsports in 2020, and compete for Rookie of the Year honors. He would pull off an impressive season, scoring 3 wins, 14 top 5s, and 22 top 10s. He finished 4th in the final standings, and winning Rookie of the Year. He would have a breakout season in 2021, finishing inside the top 10 in all but three races. He would win the championship with 6 wins, 28 top 5s, and 37 top 10s. He would also win two more titles that season, the USAC Indiana Midget Week, and the Make-A-Wish Trophy Cup. As of 2022, Kofoid will continue to race full time with KKM, and defend for a second championship.

POWRi Midget Racing 
Kofoid made his POWRi Midget Racing debut in 2019, driving in two races. He finished 2nd and 3rd in both races. He drove in 16 races for KKM in 2020. Despite not driving in four of the races, he managed to finish 4th in final standings, with 7 wins, 12 top 5s, and 12 top 10s. He ran half of the season in 2021, scoring 9 wins, 14 top 5s, and 15 top 10s. As of 2022, he will continue running part-time for KKM.

Late models 
In 2021, Kofoid made his debut in late model racing. He ran two races for Racing Dynamiks, finishing 12th in his first race. He would finish 3rd in his second late model start at the Nashville Fairgrounds Speedway.

NASCAR K&N Pro Series West 
In 2018, Kofoid signed with Gary Thackeray, and drove in a one off race with his team in the NASCAR K&N Pro Series West at the Las Vegas Motor Speedway Dirt Track. He started 15th and finished 21st due to a mechanical issue.

NASCAR Camping World Truck Series 
On March 31, 2022, it was announced that Kofoid will make his NASCAR Camping World Truck Series debut at the 2022 Pinty's Truck Race on Dirt, driving for Kyle Busch Motorsports. Kofoid will drive with the same chassis that Martin Truex Jr. drove in the 2021 Pinty's Truck Race on Dirt, where he led 105 laps and won the race. Kofoid started 32nd due to an overheating issue during qualifying races. He quickly made his way to the front, and ran as high as 3rd in the final stage. He would finish 27th, after spinning in turn 2. Fellow driver, Derek Kraus, would run into the back of Kofoid's truck, as he was trying to avoid the wreck.

ARCA Menards Series 
On August 9, 2022, it was announced that Kofoid will make his ARCA Menards Series debut at the Illinois State Fairgrounds Racetrack, driving the No. 15 for Venturini Motorsports.

Personal life 
Kofoid is a fan of 20 time World of Outlaws champion, Steve Kinser, and NASCAR drivers, Kyle Larson and Dale Earnhardt Jr. Kofoid is currently a member of the Toyota Racing Development.

Motorsports career results

NASCAR 
(key) (Bold – Pole position awarded by qualifying time. Italics – Pole position earned by points standings or practice time. * – Most laps led.)

Camping World Truck Series

K&N Pro Series West

ARCA Menards Series 
(key) (Bold – Pole position awarded by qualifying time. Italics – Pole position earned by points standings or practice time. * – Most laps led. ** – All laps led.)

References

External links 
 Official website
 

2001 births
Living people
NASCAR drivers
ARCA Menards Series drivers
Racing drivers from California
People from Penngrove, California
Kyle Busch Motorsports drivers